Dvory may refer to:
Dvory (Nymburk District), a village in the Central Bohemian Region, Czech Republic
Dvory (Prachatice District), a village in the South Bohemian Region, Czech Republic
Dvory, Russia, a colony transferred in 1920 from Teriberskaya Volost to Alexandrovskaya Volost of Alexandrovsky Uyezd in Arkhangelsk Governorate (later in Murmansk Governorate); consequently abolished
Dvory, a part of Petržalka, a borough of Bratislava, Slovakia
Dvory (Karlovy Vary), part of the statutory city of Karlovy Vary

See also
Dvory nad Lužnicí, a village in the South Bohemian Region, Czech Republic
Dvory nad Žitavou, in the Nitra Region, Slovakia
Hluboké Dvory, a village in the South Moravian Region, Czech Republic
Tři Dvory, a village in the Central Bohemian Region, Czech Republic